Halanaerobacter chitinovorans is a species of bacteria, the type species of its genus. It is a halophilic, anaerobic, chitinolytic bacterium. Its cells are long, gram-negative, motile, flexible rods.

References

Further reading
Whitman, William B., et al., eds. Bergey's manual® of systematic bacteriology. Vol. 3. Springer, 2012.
Dworkin, Martin, and Stanley Falkow, eds. The Prokaryotes: Vol. 4: Bacteria: Firmicutes, Cyanobacteria. Vol. 4. Springer, 2006.
Oren, Aharon. Halophilic microorganisms and their environments. Vol. 5. Springer, 2002.

External links
J.P. Euzéby: List of Prokaryotic names with Standing in Nomenclature

Halanaerobiales
Bacteria described in 1996